29 Bahman Metro Station is a station on Tabriz Metro Line 1. The station opened on 27 August 2015. It is located on 29 Bahman Boulevard at Tabriz Cable Bridge. It is between Khayyam Metro Station and Ostad Shahriar Metro Station.

References

Tabriz Metro stations